The Kostroma Power Station (Kostromskaya GRES) is a gas-fired power station near Volgorechensk in Russia. The station consists of eight 300 MW units and a single 1,200 MW unit. Of which, the 1,200MW unit is the world's largest gas-fired power station unit.

See also 

 List of largest power stations in the world
 List of natural gas power stations
 List of power stations in Russia

References 

Buildings and structures in Kostroma Oblast
Natural gas-fired power stations in Russia
Chimneys in Russia